Lunar Womb is the second studio album by American heavy metal band The Obsessed. It was released in 1991 by Hellhound Records and reissued in 2006 by MeteorCity. The painting on the cover is entitled Saturn Devouring His Son by Francisco de Goya.

Track listing
All songs written by The Obsessed.

 "Brother Blue Steel" – 3:26
 "Bardo" – 2:20
 "Hiding Mask" – 3:53
 "Spew" – 3:06
 "Kachina" – 3:43
 "Jaded" – 3:57
 "Back to Zero" – 3:57
 "No Blame" – 1:25
 "No Mas" – 2:51
 "Endless Circles" – 4:11
 "Lunar Womb" – 6:21
 "Embryo" – 1:46

Personnel
Scott "Wino" Weinrich – vocals and guitar, producer
Scott Reeder – bass, vocals on "Bardo" and "Back to Zero", producer, additional engineering
Greg Rogers – drums, producer

Production
Mathias Schneeberger – producer, engineer
Michael Böhl, Tom Reiss – executive producers

References

1991 albums
The Obsessed albums
Hellhound Records albums